Abercrombie Township is a township in Richland County, North Dakota, United States. Its population during the 2000 Census was 285. Abercrombie Township had an estimated population of 249 as of 2009.

History
Abercrombie Township was organized March 12, 1883, when still part of the Dakota Territory.  Settlement in the area began in the late 1860s and early 1870s, mainly by people of Scandinavian ancestry. Fort Abercrombie, first built in 1858 and rebuilt in 1861, was a prominent fixture in the township.

References

Townships in Richland County, North Dakota
Wahpeton micropolitan area
1883 establishments in Dakota Territory
Townships in North Dakota